Victoria, officially the Municipality of Victoria,  is a 2nd class municipality in the province of Oriental Mindoro, Philippines. According to the 2020 census, it has a population of 52,175 people.

The Municipality of Victoria is known as "Fruit Basket of Oriental Mindoro" and celebrates its annual Kapakyanan Festival every October 15 as graces and thanks giving for the bountiful blessings that every Victoreños received from God.

History

Victoria was once part of the municipality of Naujan until its creation on October 15, 1953, and was originally known as Barbocolon or “a big river”.

The municipality was named after Victoria Quirino, daughter of President Elpidio Quirino.

Geography

Barangays
Victoria is politically subdivided into 32 barangays. Five (5) barangays are classified as urban (Alcate, Leido, Macatoc, Poblacion I, Poblacion III) and other 27 barangays are rural.

Climate

Demographics

Out of the 32 barangays of Victoria, eight are perceived to be Ilokano dominated communities. In fact, several Punong Barangays (Barangay Captains) and kagawads are Ilokanos. One barangay is even a namesake of the place where they came from: Urdaneta.

Economy

Tourism
 Villa Villapando Resort
 Tongloy Mountain Lake
 Fruit Orchards
 Philippine Tree Farm, Inc.
 Polester and Butterfly Farms
 Gipit Picnic Grove
 Villa Bautista Resort
 Double L Resort
 Singko Marias Agrifarm
 Aurelio B. Escala Plant Nursery

Education

Colleges:
 Mindoro State University (MinSU)
 ACMCL College
 Mina de Oro Institute of Science and Technology (MIST)
 ARABEL Technical School

High Schools:
 Aurelio Arago Memorial National High School (AAMNHS)
 Macatoc National High School (MNHS)
 Good Shepherd Academy (GSA)
 Oriental Mindoro Academy (OMA)
 Alcate National High School
 Lakeside Institute
Our Lady of the Most Holy Rosary Academy (OLMHRA)
 ACMCL College
 Bethel High School 
 Fortunato G. Perez High School
 Victoria High School

Elementary Schools:
 Bethel Elementary School
 San Antonio Elementary School (SAES)
 Victoria Central School
 Simon Gayutin Memorial Elementary School (SGMES)
 Ali-aly Roldan Memorial Elementary School
 Macatoc Elementary School
 Duongan Elementary School
 Pakyas Elementary School
 Good Shepherd Academy (GSA)
 Loyal Elementary School (LES)
 ACMCL College
 Jesus Is Lord Christian School (JILCS)
 Antonino Elementary School
 Bagong Buhay Elementary School
 Alcate Elementary School
 Minas Elementary School
 Villa Cerveza Elementary School
 Jose P. Viola Villarica Memorial Elementary School (JPVVMES)

Notable personalities

Michelle Callo Arcangel - Miss Oriental Mindoro 1990, the First Mindoreña who won, 1st Runner-up in Binibing Pilipinas 1999 and aside to that, she was also awarded as Best in Swimsuit and Bb. Avon. Became a model of known clothing and designer brands, cellphone company, slimmer’s world international, ramp & ads model and now based in Canada.
Rachel Anne M. Bustamante, a.k.a. Shey Bustamante -  Miss Oriental Mindoro 2009, First runner up in Mossimo Bikini Contest (2009), Binibining Pilipinas 2010 Contestant and a Pinoy Big Brother: Teen Clash 2010 Housemate. Shey is one of the Artist and Talent of Star Magic of ABS-CBN.  Appeared in ABS-CBN Primetime Dramas and Shows, ASAP, MMK, Sabel, Angelito: Batang Ama, Nasaan Ka Elisa?, Mundo Man ay Magunaw and Princess and I.

References

External links 
Victoria Profile at PhilAtlas.com
[ Philippine Standard Geographic Code]
Philippine Census Information
Local Governance Performance Management System

Municipalities of Oriental Mindoro